= Light bending =

Light bending may refer to:

- gravitational lensing, when light is "bent" around a massive object
- refraction, a change in direction of a wave due to a change in its speed
